The following is a list of libraries in Nepal.

Libraries

References 

 
Nepal education-related lists
Lists of buildings and structures in Nepal
Nepal